The 30 largest trade partners of the United States represent 87.9% of U.S. exports, and 87.4% of U.S. imports . These figures do not include services or foreign direct investment.

The largest US partners with their total trade in goods (sum of imports and exports) in billions of US dollars for calendar year 2021 are as follows:

Countries of which United States is the largest trading partner
The United States is also the primary export or import partner of several countries. The percentages on these tables are based on 2016 data as shown on the CIA World Factbook.

See also
Economy of the United States
List of imports of the United States
Value added tax trade criticism
List of the largest trading partners of Australia
List of the largest trading partners of the ASEAN
List of the largest trading partners of Canada
List of the largest trading partners of China
List of the largest trading partners of the European Union
List of the largest trading partners of Germany
List of the largest trading partners of Italy
List of the largest trading partners of the Netherlands
List of the largest trading partners of India
List of the largest trading partners of Russia
List of the largest trading partners of United Kingdom

References

Foreign trade of the United States
Trading partners
Lists of trading partners